Parque la Junta (La Junta Park) is a baseball field built in 1947 in Nuevo Laredo, Tamaulipas, Mexico. The ball park has a capacity of 5,000 people.  The stadium was home to the five-time champion Mexican Baseball League team Tecolotes de los Dos Laredos (The Owls of the Two Laredos) from 1947 to 2003. In 2019, the Tecolotes began using the park as their home stadium in Mexico instead of Estadio Nuevo Laredo. Thus, they will split home games between Parque la Junta and Uni-Trade Stadium, which is located across the river in Laredo, Texas.

References

Baseball venues in Mexico
Mexican League ballparks
Nuevo Laredo
Sports in Laredo, Texas
Sports venues in Tamaulipas
Sports venues completed in 1947
1947 establishments in Mexico